The Fast Mail is a lost 1922 American silent melodrama film directed by Bernard J. Durning and starring Buck Jones (credited as Charles Jones) and Eileen Percy. It was produced and distributed by the Fox Film Corporation.

Cast
Buck Jones as Stanley Carson
Eileen Percy as Virginia Martin
James "Jim" Mason as Lee Mason
William Steele as Pierre La Fitte
Adolphe Menjou as Cal Baldwin
Harry Dunkinson as Harry Joyce

See also
1937 Fox vault fire

References

External links
The Fast Mail at IMDb.com

lobby poster

1922 films
American silent feature films
Lost American films
Fox Film films
1922 drama films
Silent American drama films
American black-and-white films
Melodrama films
1922 lost films
Lost drama films
Films directed by Bernard Durning
1920s American films